Blue Summit is an unincorporated community and census-designated place (CDP) lodged between Kansas City and Independence in Jackson County, Missouri, United States. It is part of the Kansas City metropolitan area.

It is located in the Independence School District, and is zoned to Korte Elementary, Nowlin Middle School, and Van Horn High School. It was previously in the Kansas City, Missouri School District, where it was zoned to West Rock Creek Elementary School, Nowlin Middle School, and Van Horn High School.

The community is served by Missouri Route 78, Missouri Route 12 & Interstate 435.

Demographics

References

Unincorporated communities in Jackson County, Missouri
Unincorporated communities in Missouri
Census-designated places in Jackson County, Missouri
Census-designated places in Missouri